Jean Tristan may refer to:

 Jean Tristan (pirate) (died 1693), French corsair (buccaneer) and pirate
 Jean Tristan, Count of Valois (1250–1270), French prince of the Capetian dynasty